Prince Alexis Obolensky Jr. (April 20, 1915 – February 8, 1986), a Russian-American socialite and sometimes called the "father of modern backgammon," was a member of the princely Obolensky family of the Rurik Dynasty.

Early life
Obolensky was born in Saint Petersburg, Russia, on April 20, 1915. He was the son of Alexey Alexandrovitch Obolensky (1883–1942) and Lubov Petrovna "Luba" (née Troubetzkoy) Obolensky (1888–1980). Among his siblings was older sister Alexandra Obolensky, the wife of Anatol Nicholas Sazonoff, Princess Luba Troubetzkoy of Sea Cliff on Long Island.  He was a cousin of Prince Serge Obolensky, who married the American heiress Ava Alice Muriel Astor.

In 1917, his family fled to Istanbul from Russia during the Bolshevik Revolution, and in the 1920s, they emigrated to the United States from France.  He later attended the Kent School in Kent, Connecticut, and graduated from the University of Virginia, where he was a member of the Virginia Glee Club and Zeta Psi.

Career
Obolensky worked as a real estate broker in the Palm Beach area, where he maintained a home.

During the 1960s and 1970s, he traveled widely promoting backgammon as a gambling and tournament game.  He co-founded the World Backgammon Club, an organization in Manhattan that sponsors international tournaments, serving as its president until his death.

Personal life
On January 6, 1939, Obolensky was married to Jane Wheeler Irby (1914–1981), a Fermata School graduate, in Aiken, who was the daughter of Robert Garland Irby, at Manassas, Virginia. They finally divorced, in April 1952, and were the parents of three children:

 Anne Obolensky
 Alexis Obolensky Jr. (1944–1999)
 Mary Obolensky (1946–1986), who married Antony Underwood of London.

On November 22, 1952, he was married to Katherine Taylor "Kappy" (née Pearce) Gennett (1919–1998), the former wife of Carter Tate Gennett and daughter of J. McAlister Pearce, in New York City.  His first wife later remarried to Harold Hegeler Lihme in November 1953.  They also divorced and in 1965, he married Jacqueline Ann Stedman (1939–2002).

Obolensky died at his home in Manhattan on February 8, 1986.

Legacy
In 2018, Obolensky was elected to the Backgammon Hall of Fame.

Published works 
 Obolensky, Alexis (with Ted James): Backgammon: The Action Game, Collier Books, 1969,

References

External links

1915 births
1986 deaths
Alexis
Trubetskoy family
University of Virginia alumni
American backgammon players
Kent School alumni
White Russian emigrants to the United States